The University of Colombo (informally Colombo University or UoC) is a public research university located primarily in Colombo, Sri Lanka. It is the oldest institution of modern higher education in Sri Lanka. Specialised in the fields of natural, social, and applied sciences as well as mathematics, computer sciences, and law. It is ranked among the top 10 universities in South Asia.

The University of Colombo was founded in 1921 as University College Colombo, affiliated to the University of London. Degrees were issued to its students from 1923 onwards. The university traces its roots to 1870 when the Ceylon Medical School was established. UoC has produced notable alumni in the fields of science, law, economics, business, literature, and politics.

Overview
The university is a state university, with most of its funding coming from the central government via the University Grants Commission (UGC). Therefore, as with all other state universities in Sri Lanka, the UGC recommends its vice-chancellor for appointment by the President of Sri Lanka and makes appointments of its administrative staff. Its motto is "Buddhih Sarvatra Bhrajate", which means "Wisdom shines forth everywhere" in Sanskrit.

With a student population of over 11,000, the university is made up of seven faculties with 43 academic departments and eight other institutions. Most faculties offer both undergraduate and postgraduate degrees, with some offering courses for external students and distance-learning programs.

Location

The administrative center of the university is the College House, which houses the office of the vice-chancellor. Its period architecture is a city landmark.

The College House, the Faculty of Graduate Studies (FGS) and the Institute of Biochemistry, Molecular Biology and Biotechnology (IBMBB) are located along Kumarathunga Munidasa Mawatha (formally Thurstan Road) between Queens Road and the India House. Situated between the Thurstan Road and Reed Avenue is the iconic Old Royal College Building, King George Hall, New Arts Theatre, sports ground along with the buildings of the science faculty and the University of Colombo School of Computing (UCSC). On the other side of the Reed Avenue is the university library flanked by the arts and law faculty buildings along with the gymnasium.

The estate includes several properties outside Cinnamon Gardens, such as the Faculty of Medicine which is located at Kynsey Road opposite the Colombo General Hospital in close proximity to the Postgraduate Institute of Medicine located at Norris Canal Road. The Institute of Indigenous Medicine is located in the suburbs of Colombo in Nawala. In addition, there are several properties outside Colombo, including the Sri Palee Campus in Wewala, Horana and the Institute of Agro Technology and Rural Science in Hambantota.

History

Ceylon Medical College
The origins of the University of Colombo begins with the establishment of the Ceylon Medical School in June 1870, it was the second European medical school to be established in South Asia. In 1880 the school was raised to the status of college, thus becoming the Ceylon Medical College which permitted it to award the Licentiate in Medicine and Surgery (LMS) which continued until the late 1940s. In 1889, the college was recognised by the General Medical Council of the United Kingdom when holders of its license became eligible to practice in Great Britain.

Ceylon University College
The Ceylon University Association (CUA) was formed in 1906 by a group of western educated elite including Sir Ponnambalam Arunachalam, Sir James Peiris and Sir Marcus Fernando. Owing to the persistent demands of the CUA the government decided in 1913 to set up a University college.

Arguments regarding the nature and status of the institution to be set up, its location, and the outset of World War I halted the establishment process until 1920 when the government purchased a private mansion called the Regina Walawwa which later came to be known as College House for the purpose of setting up the University College under the recommendations of Sir Edward Denham.

The Ceylon University College was formally declared open in January 1921 in the building that was originally the main building of Royal College Colombo located on Kumarathunga Munidasa Mawatha (formally Thurstan Road) opposite College House. The University College was affiliated to the University of London and prepared students for University of London external degrees which were jointly examined. Even though this fell short of a full university for Ceylon, it proved a platform to develop the academia required for a university. It had two departments: Arts and Science.

University of Ceylon
The University of Ceylon was established on 1 July 1942 by the Ceylon University Ordinance No.20 of 1942 which was passed by the State Council of Ceylon amidst World War II and threat of Japanese invasion. The Ceylon University College and the Ceylon Medical College were combined to form the University of Ceylon, with its administration based at College House and ability to grant its own degrees. The two departments of Arts and Science of the University College were upgraded to faculties, the Medical College became the faculty of medicine and a new faculty of Oriental Studies was established at Cruden House. The university library was based at Villa Venezia in Queens Road. Residential facilities were provided at the Union Hostel with three halls of residence Jayatilleke and Arunachalam based at Guildford Crescent and Queens Hall (Q Hall or Women's hostel) along with two other hostels named Brodie and Aquinas.

Following the completion of new buildings at Peradeniya, departments of Law and Agriculture and department of Veterinary Science, were transferred out of Colombo to Peradeniya in 1949, however the department of law was brought back to Colombo in 1965. Later in 1952, the faculties of Arts and Oriental Studies were moved to Peradeniya too along with sections of the university administration and library. Two halls of residence, Jayatilleke hall and Arunachalam hall were transferred to Peradeniya too. A Faculty of Engineering was established in 1950 was later transferred to Peradeniya in 1965.

Sections of the University of Ceylon, functioned in Colombo and Peradeniya acted as campuses of the same university until 1966. But in 1966, these campuses were split into two. The section located in Colombo was known as the University of Ceylon, Colombo, while the section located in Peradeniya was known as University of Ceylon, Peradeniya.

University of Ceylon, Colombo Campus
The announcement of the creation of a separate university in Colombo was made in Parliament in the Throne Speech of 1967. The necessary legislation for this purpose had been prepared by the Minister of Education and Cultural Affairs under section 34 of the Higher Education Act No. 20 of 1966 on the recommendation of the National Council of Higher Education. The new institution, which came into existence on 1 October 1967 with the Colombo Campus as its nucleus, had a student population of nearly 5000 reading for degrees in arts, law, the sciences and medicine, and a teaching staff of nearly 300.

The University of Ceylon Act No. 1 of 1972, which replaced the Higher Education Act of 1966 altered the university structure. The four independent autonomous universities (University of Ceylon, Peradeniya, University of Ceylon, Colombo, Vidyodaya University and Vidyalankara University) which had been set up by then and the Ceylon College of Technology at Katubedda became campuses of a single university styled the University of Sri Lanka. Its headquarters designated Senate House was located in Colombo. This arrangement did not last very long. With the promulgation of the Universities Act. No 16 of 1978, university status was again restored to the Campuses and the Colombo Campus of the University of Sri Lanka was renamed the University of Colombo, Sri Lanka.

University of Colombo
Under the Universities Act No. 16, 1978, the University of Sri Lanka was split into six independent, autonomous universities as University of Colombo, University of Peradeniya, University of Sri Jayewardenepura, University of Kelaniya, University of Moratuwa and University of Jaffna. This Act brought back some of the central features of the Ceylon University Ordinance of 1942 such as the Senates, the Councils, and Courts.

In 1978 the University of Colombo had Faculties of Medicine, Arts, Science, Education and Law. In the gradual expansion that followed in the 1980s, a Faculty of Management and Finance was established as well as Faculty of Graduate Studies was created by an Ordinance of the UGC in 1987. The Sri Palee Campus of the university was established by a Gazette notification in 1996. In 1978, the Postgraduate Institute of Medicine, the Institute of Workers' Education and the Institute of Indigenous medicine were affiliated with the University of Colombo. The Institute of Computer Technology (ICT) was established in 1987 which became the Computer School in 2002.

Governance and administration

The UoC is a state university and depends on the government for much of its annual grant, which is provided by the University Grants Commission (UGC). Due to this, its administration is heavily influenced by the UGC. Undergraduate education is completely free. The Governance of the university is under the provisions of the Universities Act No. 16 of 1978 and the Universities (Amendment) Act No. 7 of 1985 along with its own by-laws.

The university's administration is based upon that of the former University of Ceylon consisting of a dual structure of bodies: the council (formally known as the University Court which is the governing body) and the Academic Senate (academic affairs).

Much of the appointments to officers and faculty are carried out by these bodies, however on the recommendations of the UGC.

Officers of the university
Chancellor

The Chancellor is the head of the university and awards all degrees, although most duties are carried out by the Vice-Chancellor. The appointment is made by the President of Sri Lanka, to a distinguished person in academics, clergy or in the civil society. The chancellor is Ven. Muruththettuwe Ananda Thero.

Vice-Chancellor
Day-to-day management of the university is undertaken by the Vice-Chancellor, appointed by the President of Sri Lanka. The Vice-Chancellor is Senior Professor Chandrika Wijeratne.

Rector
The Rector is head of the Sri Palee Campus, thus undertakes its management, appointed by the Vice-Chancellor. The Rector of the Sri Palee Campus is Dr Ranjan Hettiarachchi.

Organisation

The University of Colombo has seven faculties of study. These faculties contain 41 academic departments in addition to the faculties it has a small campus and a computer school that contain five academic departments of their own. In addition, the university has six institutions and five affiliated centres. At the beginning, it had only four of the current faculties, namely; the Faculty of Law, the Faculty of Medicine, the Faculty of Education and the Faculty of Science. Since then, three other faculties have been added. The latest addition is the University of Colombo School of Computing which was established in 2002

There are six postgraduate institutions affiliated, three of which are located on campus. These include the Postgraduate Institute of Medicine, the only institution in the country that provides specialist training of medical doctors. The Colombo Planetarium and the Colombo Observatory are located within the main campus of the university.

University Library

University of Colombo library is a centrally-administered network of libraries of the university primary made up of the main library and two branch libraries. It is the oldest academic library in the country since its constituent Colombo Medical College library was established in 1870. Containing 400,000 plus items, it is one of the largest libraries in the country. Two branches of the library are established in faculties in the Faculty of Medicine and the Faculty of Science. The Ceylon Collection and the Rare Collection contains large number of important documents and books including a large palm-leaf manuscript collection.

Publications

The UoC publishes some of the key academic journals in the country.
 University of Colombo Review
 The Ceylon Journal of Medical Science
 Sri Lanka Journal of International Law
 International Journal on Advances in ICT for Emerging Regions
 Sri Lanka Journal of Bio-Medical Informatics
 Sri Lanka Journal of Critical Care

International collaborations 
UoC has established international links with universities around the world. Such links would be traced as far back as 1921 when the University College Colombo established close links to the University of London. Modern links have led to several global partnerships that have resulted in exchange in teaching and learning models, collaborative research, curriculum design, and student exchange.

The International Unit of the University of Colombo (IUUC) coordinates and develops international links. IUUC facilitates staff exchanges, distance learning, dual degree programs, joint conferences, seminars, workshops and academic networking.

Global networking
UoC is a member of several international academic networks:
 Asian Universities Alliance (AUA)
 Association of Commonwealth Universities (ACU)
 Association of Southeast Asian Institutions of Higher Learning (ASAIHL)
 International Association of Universities (IAU)

International teaching and research partners
  La Trobe University, Australia
  Western Sydney University, Australia
  Monash University, Australia
  University of British Columbia, Canada
  University of Ottawa, Canada
  Darmstadt University of Technology, Germany
  City University of Hong Kong, Hong Kong
  Mahatma Gandhi University, India
  Ritsumeikan University, Japan
  University of Oslo, Norway
  National University of Singapore, Singapore
  University of Uppsala, Sweden
  University of London, United Kingdom
  University of Pennsylvania, United States

Government partnerships
  European Molecular Biology Network
  Government of Sweden – research Cooperation: SAREC Project
  Swedish International Development Cooperation Agency (SIDA)
  United Nations Development Programme (UNDP) – Research co-operation

Student life
Student organizations
Over 10,000 students attend the University of Colombo and others follow external degree programs conducted by the university. Students at the University of Colombo run over 40 clubs and organizations, including cultural and religious groups, academic clubs and teams, and common-interest organizations. Each faculty has its own Students Unions, where committee members are elected to by the students of the faculty. These student societies include:

 Arts Students' Union
 Medical Students' Union
 Science Faculty Students' Council
 Moot Court and Debating Society, Faculty of Law
 Law Students' Union
 UCSC Students' Union
 Religious Societies
 Buddhist Students' Association
 Muslim Majlis
 Hindu Students' Union
 Catholic Students' Movement
 Student Christian Movement

 FMF Media Unit - Faculty of Management and Finance Media Unit
 AIESEC Colombo Central Local Committee
 Epsilon Delta Society
 Rotaract Club
 Computer Science Society (CompSoc)
 UCSC ISACA Student Group
 Tamil Literary Union
 Mathematical and Astronomical Society
 Physics Society
 FOS Media - Faculty of Science Media Unit
 University Amalgamated Club

Residential facilities
Since its inception, the University of Colombo has maintained residential facilities for its undergraduate students. This has been an integral part of the urban university culture of the UoC. Some of the early residential halls that were part of the Union Hostal which was based in Colombo were moved to Peradeniya in the 1950s, these residential halls function independently now. Currently, the university has seven student hostels along with several houses leased on a temporary basis which is administrated by the Student's Center. These hostels provide accommodation for 2973 undergraduate students annually. Residential facilities for academics and visiting faculty are provided both on and off campus.

Men
 De Saram Hostel
 Bloemfontein Medical Hostel
 The Lamela Hostel
 Kithyakara Hostel

Women
 Sujata Jayawardena Memorial Hostel
 Muttiah Hostel
 Havelock Road Hostel

Clubs and sports
In the university, there are forty-three Students' societies and associations functioning in the university engaging in activities and interests. The university has a strong Rotaract movement with clubs established in three faculties.

Sports activities of the university are implemented by the Department of Physical Education via the University Amalgamated Club. The Amalgamated Club includes 29 Captains and Vice-Captains of the major sports played by the UoC at an inter-university level. The Amalgamated club's strong movement to the university sports can be seen from 2006, under the president Sachitra Samarasinghe. The Sports Board is an advisory body to the Department of Physical Education. Annually the university takes part in the Inter-University sports Championships and the University Games. Within the university, itself inter-faculty tournaments and the University Championship are held and University Colours awarded. The UoC has links with many sports bodies such as Sri Lanka Cricket, Sri Lanka Rugby Football Union, Tennis Association of Sri Lanka, Colombo Rowing Club, etc.

Facilities for most sports are provided within the university, with a gymnasium for indoor sports and the university sports ground for out door sports. The swimming and rowing team has use of the swimming pool of Royal College Colombo and the Colombo Rowing Club facilities respectively.

The University of Colombo are the overall champions of the Sri Lanka University Games which is held every four years among the public universities in Sri Lanka. The university is also the most successful in the games winning 8 out of the 10 championships since its inception in 1980.

Past Chancellors and Vice-Chancellors

Chancellors
 University of Ceylon
 Sir Andrew Caldecott (1942–44)
 Sir Henry Monck-Mason Moore (1944–49)
 Lord Soulbury (1949–54)
 Sir Oliver Goonetilleke (1954–62)
 William Gopallawa (1962–72)
 University of Sri Lanka
 William Gopallawa (1972–78)
 University of Colombo
 J.R. Jayewardene (1978–1981)
 P.R. Anthonis (1981–2002)
 Oswald Gomis (2002-2021)
 Ven. Muruththettuwe Ananda Thero (17 November 2021 - Present)

Presidents
 Colombo Campus (1972–1977)
 Osmund Jayaratne
 M. B. Ariyapala
 P. P. G. L. Siriwardena
 Hiran Dias

Vice-Chancellors
 University College Colombo
 Robert Marrs (1922–1939)
 Sir Ivor Jennings (1940–1942)
 University of Ceylon
 Sir Ivor Jennings (1942–1954)
 Sir Nicholas Attygalle (1954–1967)
 O.H. de A. Wijesekera (1967)
 University of Ceylon, Colombo
 Walwin A. de Silva (1968–1969)
 B. A. Abeywickrema (1969–1972)
 University of Sri Lanka
 B. A. Abeywickrema (1972–1974)
 L. H. Sumanadasa(1974)
 P. P. G. L. Siriwardena (1974–1978)
 University of Colombo
 Stanley Wijesundera (1978–1988)
 G. L. Peiris (1988–1994)
 Nandadasa Kodagoda (1994)
 W. D. Lakshman (1994–1999)
 Savitri Goonesekere (1999–2002)
 T. Hettiarachchy (2002–2007)
 Kshanika Hirimburegama (2007–2013)
 W. K. Hirimburegama (2013–2015)
 Lakshman Dissanayake (2015-2019)
 Chandrika N. Wijayaratne (2019-2022)

Notable people

See also
 List of split up universities

Further reading
 Jennings, Sir Ivor The Road to Peradeniya (Autobiography),

References

External links 

 University of Colombo
 Map of UoC main campus
 Computer Science Society University of Colombo
 University of Colombo rowing
 Sri Palee Campus

 
Educational institutions established in 1870
Universities in Sri Lanka
Universities and colleges in Colombo
Statutory boards of Sri Lanka
1870 establishments in Ceylon